The compound of two inverted snub dodecadodecahedra is a uniform polyhedron compound. It's composed of the 2 enantiomers of the inverted snub dodecadodecahedron.

References 
.

Polyhedral compounds